Raxaul Junction railway station is a main railway station in East Champaran district, Bihar. Its code is RXL. It serves Raxaul city and also as gateway to Nepal as the most important station on the Indo-Nepal border. The station consists of five platforms.

History 
Raxaul–Amlekhganj line was constructed in 1927. It was Nepal's first railway line. Narrow-gauge line of 48 km was closed in 1965 as new line was constructed to Inland Container Depot at Sirsiya near Birgunj and was opened in 2005.

Lines and location 
The station is situated on the Delhi–Gorakhpur–Raxaul–Muzaffarpur–Kolkata lines. Earlier, all tracks were metre gauge but most have been converted to  broad gauge. After the completion of the gauge conversion from Darbhanga to Raxaul via Sitamarhi, another broad-gauge route to Raxaul became available from March 2014.

See also 
 Bhikhna Thori railway station

References

Railway stations in East Champaran district
Samastipur railway division
Railway junction stations in Bihar
Transport in Raxaul